Paul Edwin Trimble (March 24, 1913 – November 16, 2005) was a Vice Admiral in the United States Coast Guard who served as the 10th Vice Commandant from 1966 to 1970. He was born in Agenda, Kansas and was raised in Milaca, Minnesota.

Trimble earned a B.S. degree from the United States Coast Guard Academy in June 1936 and later received an M.B.A. with Distinction from the Harvard Business School in June 1942.

References

1913 births
2005 deaths
United States Coast Guard Academy alumni
Harvard Business School alumni
United States Coast Guard admirals
Recipients of the Coast Guard Distinguished Service Medal
Recipients of the Legion of Merit
Vice Commandants of the United States Coast Guard